North Carolina's 8th House district is one of 120 districts in the North Carolina House of Representatives. It has been represented by Democrat Gloristine Brown since 2023.

Geography
Since 2023, the district has included part of Pitt County. The district overlaps with the 5th Senate district.

District officeholders since 1999

Election results

2022

2020

2018

2016

2014

2012

2010

2008

2006

2004

2002

2000

References

North Carolina House districts
Pitt County, North Carolina